Sint Willebrord is a town in the municipality of Rucphen in the Netherlands. It is also known by the name 't Heike which was the semi-official name up until 1950/1970 (mostly written as Theike, or less often Heike), which is the diminutive form of hei (heath) in local dialect. This town was formed on the former boundary between the "Baronie of Breda" and "Het Markizaat of Bergen op Zoom". Sint Willebrord is the largest of the five towns in the municipality of Rucphen. During Carnaval the town goes by the name of Heikneutersland Basically meaning ´Hillbillies´ land´ or ´Redneck's land´. The name "Sint Willebrord" comes from Saint Willibrord. Sint is the usual form in Dutch names to represent saints. Cyclist Wim van Est and footballer Rini (Pallack) Konings were famous sports personalities from Sint Willebrord.

Gallery

References 

Populated places in North Brabant
Rucphen